Vigrestad Station is a railway station located at Vigrestad in Hå, Norway on Sørland Line. The station is served by the Jæren Commuter Rail between Stavanger and Egersund.

References

External links
 Jernbaneverket Vigrestad profile 

Railway stations on the Sørlandet Line
Railway stations in Hå
Railway stations opened in 1878
1878 establishments in Norway